Neshaminy Creek Brewing Company is a brewery founded in 2010 in the town of Croydon in lower Bucks County, Pennsylvania, USA. It is considered to be the first production brewery in the county, and borders the city of Philadelphia.

History 
Neshaminy Creek Brewing Company was founded in 2010, and is currently owned by Rob Jahn, Steve Capelli, and Jenna Ball. It takes its name from the nearby creek of the same name, from which it draws water for its beer. The facility itself, located at 909 Ray Avenue, officially opened on June 1, 2012. In 2013, the Churchville Lager won a gold medal at the Great American Beer Festival. In 2016, Neshaminy Creek won two bronze medals at the Great American Beer Festival for Churchville Lager and Croydon is Burning. In 2021, Croydon is Burning was awarded a gold medal at the Great American Beer Festival in the category of smoked beer, out of 73 entries. In May 2022, the Warehouse Lager placed first at the World Beer Cup in the "International Pilsener or International Lager" category, out of 231 entries.

Neshaminy Creek has grown exponentially over the years and expanded distribution across Pennsylvania, New Jersey, Delaware, Maryland, and New York. In Summer 2020, Neshaminy Creek opened another location inside the Ferry Market located in New Hope, Pennsylvania, where guests can purchase on-site pints and beer to-go.

Products 
The company brews six year-round beers and several seasonal beers, which are distributed to the greater Philadelphia area and New Jersey.

Year-Round
 Churchville Lager
 County Line IPA
 J.A.W.N. (American pale ale)
 The Shape of Hops to Come (Imperial IPA)
 Wayward Wheat (Hefeweizen)

Seasonal
 After The Party (Irish-style dry stout)
 Beach Fuzz (Belgian-style wheat ale)
 Hidden Champion (Schwarzbier)
 Croydon Cream Ale
 Tribute Belgian Tripel
 Mudbank Milk Stout (January–February)
Coconut Mudbank Milk Stout (Limited)
Imperial Chocolate Mudbank Milk Stout (Limited)
 Leon Russian Imperial Stout (March–April)
 Highwater Hefeweizen (May–July)
 Punkless Dunkel Pumpkin Wheat Ale (September)
 Creekfestbier (Oktoberfestbier) (September)

Semi-Annual
 Blitzkrieg Double IPA

Limited Offerings
 Croydon is Burning (Smoked beer)
 Bourbon Barrel Aged Punkless Dunkel
 Concrete Pillow American Barleywine
 Concrete Pillow English Barleywine
 Bourbon Barrel Aged Leon Russian Imperial Stout
 Bourbon Barrel Aged Concrete Pillow American Barleywine
 HBS Stout
 Tart Tooth sour beer

See also
 List of breweries in Philadelphia
 List of breweries in Pennsylvania
 Beer in the United States
 Barrel-aged beer

References

External links 
 Official website

American beer brands
Beer brewing companies based in Pennsylvania
Food and drink companies based in Philadelphia
2010 establishments in Pennsylvania